Charles Cardale Babington (23 November 1808 – 22 July 1895) was an English botanist and archaeologist.  He was elected a Fellow of the Royal Society in 1851.
Babington was the son of Joseph Babington and Cathérine née Whitter, and a nephew of Thomas Babington Macaulay. He was educated at Charterhouse and St John's College, Cambridge, obtaining his Bachelor of Arts in 1830 and his Master of Arts in 1833. He overlapped at Cambridge with Charles Darwin, and in 1829 they argued over who should have the pick of beetle specimens from a local dealer.
He obtained the chair of botany at the University of Cambridge in 1861 and wrote several papers on insects. He married Anna Maria Walker on 3 April 1866.

Babington was a member of several scientific societies including the Botanical Society of Edinburgh, the Linnean Society of London (1853), the Geological Society of London, the Royal Society (1851), and in 1833 he participated in the foundation of the Royal Entomological Society. Babington  was President of the Cambrian Archaeological Association at their meeting at Church Stretton in 1881 and for many years served as Chairman of the council of the Association.

He wrote Manual of British Botany (1843), Flora of Cambridgeshire (1860), The British Rubi (1869) and edited the publication Annals and Magazine of Natural History from 1842. His herbarium and library are conserved by the University of Cambridge.

References

Allen G. Debus (ed.) (1968). World Who’s Who in Science. A Biographical Dictionary of Notable Scientists from Antiquity to the Present. Marquis-Who's Who (Chicago) : xvi + 1855 p.
Anthony Musgrave (1932). Bibliography of Australian Entomology, 1775-1930, with biographical notes on authors and collectors, Royal Zoological Society of News South Wales (Sydney) : viii + 380.

Further reading

External links

1808 births
1895 deaths
Fellows of the Royal Society
English entomologists
English Anglicans
Fellows of the Linnean Society of London
Alumni of St John's College, Cambridge
English botanists
People educated at Charterhouse School
English archaeologists
Members of the Cambrian Archaeological Association
English magazine editors
Coleopterists
Professors of Botany (Cambridge)
19th-century British journalists
British male journalists
Cardale